The Campbell Sports Center, a Columbia University's Baker Field Athletics Complex, is designed by Steven Holl and senior partner Chris McVoy.
Sited on the corner of West 218th street and Broadway, the Campbell Sports Center
aims to form an inviting new gateway to the Baker Athletics Complex, the primary athletics
facility for the University’s outdoor sports program.

Steven Holl Architects' design concept for the building is based on "points on the ground, lines in space," which refers to field play diagrams used for football, soccer, baseball, and develops from point foundations on the sloping site. External stairs and terraces along the facade connect the building with the athletic fields below, giving views from the upper levels over the Baker Athletics Complex and Manhattan.

The five story, 48,000sf facility, which opened in Fall 2012, will house strength and conditioning spaces, offices for varsity sports, an auditorium, a hospitality suite and student-athlete study rooms.

Reviews
Michael Kimmelman of The New York Times called it "not a beauty. But it is a tough, sophisticated and imaginative work of architecture for a devilish site."

References

External links
Campbell Sports Center

Sports venues in Manhattan
Columbia University campus
2012 establishments in New York City
Inwood, Manhattan
Steven Holl buildings
Sports venues completed in 2012